Charlotte Park is a census-designated place (CDP) in Charlotte County, Florida, United States. The population was 2,667 at the 2020 census. It is part of the Sarasota-Bradenton-Punta Gorda Combined Statistical Area.

Geography
Charlotte Park is located next to Punta Gorda, the Charlotte County seat, at  (26.904421, -82.046136). It is bordered by the larger city to the north, west, and south. The eastern edge of the CDP follows U.S. Route 41, the Tamiami Trail.

The CDP is crossed by several canals which lead southwest to Charlotte Harbor, an inlet of the Gulf of Mexico.

Demographics

As of the census of 2000, there were 2,182 people, 1,152 households, and 744 families residing in the CDP. The racial makeup of the CDP was 98.08% White, 0.27% African American, 0.09% Native American, 0.18% Asian, 0.64% from other races, and 0.73% from two or more races. Hispanic or Latino of any race were 2.15% of the population.

There were 1,152 households, out of which 7.6% had children under the age of 18 living with them, 58.2% were married couples living together, 4.6% had a female householder with no husband present, and 35.4% were non-families. 30.9% of all households were made up of individuals, and 22.2% had someone living alone who was 65 years of age or older.  The average household size was 1.89 and the average family size was 2.28.

In the CDP, the population was spread out, with 7.6% under the age of 18, 3.0% from 18 to 24, 11.6% from 25 to 44, 27.4% from 45 to 64, and 50.4% who were 65 years of age or older.  The median age was 65 years. For every 100 females, there were 96.4 males.  For every 100 females age 18 and over, there were 94.4 males.

The median income for a household in the CDP was $29,263, and the median income for a family was $35,462. Males had a median income of $26,397 versus $25,521 for females. The per capita income for the CDP was $22,434.  About 4.2% of families and 6.8% of the population were below the poverty line, including 9.4% of those under age 18 and 1.4% of those age 65 or over.

References

Census-designated places in Charlotte County, Florida
Census-designated places in Florida